Wisła Głębce railway station is a railway station in Wisła, Poland. Opened on 11 September 1933, it is the terminus of the Goleszów-Wisła Głębce Line. The waiting room and ticket offices were closed in February 2010.

References

Railway stations in Silesian Voivodeship
Railway stations in Poland opened in 1933